Ronny Rockel (born 12 July 1972) is a former IFBB professional bodybuilder from Germany.

Biography 

Ronny Rockel was born and raised in Germany. Like many other professional bodybuilders from Europe such as Milos Sarcev and Pavol Jablonicky, Rockel grew up under communist rule. Because of this Rockel was not aware of bodybuilding and other things of the outside world.

This soon changed in 1989 when the Berlin Wall was taken down. At seventeen years of age and 143 pounds, he decided that he wanted a body like Arnold Schwarzenegger's after seeing the film Conan the Barbarian, but at the time commercial gyms in his hometown of Chemnitz, East Germany, were non existent. Instead of abandoning his interest in bodybuilding, he created his own weight set.

Following the demise of communism, entrepreneurial activities in the East of Germany spawned and with that the first gym opened in Ronny's hometown. He soon joined and began absorbing information about diet and weight training from other members and fitness magazines.

At his first competition, the Hessian Championships, he placed last in his class. But he did not become discouraged, he came back a year later and won the 1995 NABBA German Nationals and placed third at the NABBA Mr. Universe. From then Rockel decided that he had the potential to become a professional bodybuilder.

Contest history 

1994 NABBA Hessian Championships, Did not place
1995 NABBA German Nationals Championships, 1st
1996 NABBA World Championships, Medium, 3rd
1998 NABBA Mr Universe, Medium, 2nd
1999 NABBA Mr Universe, Medium, 2nd
2000 NABBA Mr Universe, Medium, 2nd
2000 WABBA World Championships, Short, 1st
2002 WABBA International German Championships, 1st (HW and Overall) (Pro Card)
2003 IFBB Grand Prix Holland, 7th
2003 IFBB Grand Prix Hungary, 4th
2003 IFBB Maximum Pro Invitational Grand Prix, 6th
2003 IFBB Night of Champions, 15th
2004 IFBB Grand Prix Australia, 7th
2004 IFBB Grand Prix England, 7th
2004 IFBB Grand Prix Holland, 7th
2004 IFBB Hungarian Pro Invitational, 6th
2004 IFBB Ironman Pro Invitational, 10th
2004 IFBB Night of Champions, 14th
2005 IFBB Grand Prix Australia, 3rd
2005 IFBB Mr. Olympia, 17th
2006 IFBB Grand Prix Australia, 1st
2006 IFBB Mr. Olympia, 16th (tied)
2006 IFBB Grand Prix Austria, 5th
2006 IFBB Grand Prix Holland, 3rd
2007 IFBB Arnold Classic, 8th
2007 IFBB Grand Prix Australia, 2nd
2007 IFBB Colorado Pro, 4th
2007 IFBB Santa Susanna Pro, 3rd
2007 IFBB Mr. Olympia, 11th
2008 IFBB Arnolds Classic, 13th
2008 IFBB Grand Prix Australia, 6th
2008 IFBB Grand Prix New Zealand, 6th
2008 IFBB New York Pro Championships, 3rd
2008 IFBB Mr.Olympia 14th
2009 IFBB Mr.Olympia 7th
2010 IFBB Arnolds Classic, 6th
2010 IFBB Mr Europe, 1st
2010 IFBB Mr.Olympia, 6th
2011 IFBB Arnolds Classic, 6th
2011 IFBB Mr. Europe Gran Prix, 1st
2011 IFBB New York Pro Championships, 2nd
2013 IFBB Arnold Classic, 13th
2014 IFBB Ferrigno Legacy, 1st
2015 IFBB Mr. Olympia, 14th
2015 IFBB Ferrigno Legacy, 2nd
2016 IFBB Mozolani Pro (Men's 212), 2nd
2016 IFBB Mr. Olympia (Men's 212), 9th
2017 IFBB New York Pro Championships (Men's 212), 1st
2017 IFBB Toronto Pro Supershow (Men's 212), 1st
2017 IFBB Mr. Olympia (Men's 212), 7th
2017 IFBB EVL´S Prague Pro (Men's 212), 3rd
2017 IFBB Kuwait Pro (Men's 212), 7th
2018 NAC Frey Classic Pro Am, 2nd

References

External links
 Official Website

1972 births
Living people
Professional bodybuilders
German bodybuilders
People from Erzgebirgskreis
Sportspeople from Saxony